The Beaujon Hospital is located in Clichy, Paris, France and is operated by APHDP. It was named after Nicolas Beaujon, an eighteenth-century French banker.  It opened in 1935 and was designed by Jean Walter.

References

External links
Profile at Assistance Publique - Hôpitaux de Paris (in French)

Hospital buildings completed in 1935
Hospitals in Paris
Hospitals established in 1935
Buildings and structures in Seine-Saint-Denis
1935 establishments in France

20th-century architecture in France